Russia participated in the Eurovision Song Contest 1995 in Dublin, Ireland. The Russian broadcaster Russian Public Television (ORT) internally selected Philipp Kirkorov with the song "Kolybelnaya dlya vulkana", written by Ilya Bershadskiy and Ilya Resnik, to represent the nation. Prior to Kirkorov's selection, ORT organised a public selection process to select Russian entrant. While the event did take place, the jury could not decide on the winner of selection and ultimately opted to choose the artist internally. Vocal Band were selected to represent Russia, however ORT later withdrew the band as the Russian representatives due to the band members being unable to finance their participation. Kirkorov was selected and announced as the Russian representative on 29 April 1995, while his contest song "" and its accompanying music video was premiered on 30 April. Russia was drawn to appear sixth in the final, which was held on 13 May. In the final, the nation placed 17th with 17 points.

Background 

Prior to the 1995 contest, Russia had participated in the Eurovision Song Contest one time since its first entry in 1994 with the song "Vechny strannik" performed by Youddiph which placed 9th. The Russian participation in the contest alternates between two broadcasters: RTR and ORT. The Russian broadcaster for the 1995 contest, who broadcasts the event in Russia and organises the selection process for its entry, was ORT. ORT confirmed their intentions to participate in the contest in December 1994. For the 1995 contest, ORT held a national final to choose the artist and song, which will represent Russia at the contest. The broadcaster later opted to select their 1995 entry internally, since the jury was unable to select a winner.

Before Eurovision

Evrovidenie "Pesnya-95" 

Evrovidenie "Pesnya-95" was the national final format developed by ORT in order to select Russia's entry for the Eurovision Song Contest 1995. The competition was held on 19 March 1995 at the Cosmos Hotel in Moscow and was later aired on 30 April 1995 on ORT. Eight songs competed and the winner was selected by the votes of an expert jury panel. At the conclusion of the voting, Oksana Pavlovskaya and Viktoria Vita tied for the first place. In the end, jury came to the conclusion that none of the participants deserves to represent Russia and therefore final ended without a winner.

Internal selection
After the jury could not decide on the winner, it was decided to conduct an internal selection. Vocal Band were selected to represent Russia, however, ORT later withdrew the band due to the group's members being unable to finance their participation. Philip Kirkorov was later selected instead. Kirkorov was announced as the Russian representative on 29 April 1995, while his contest song "Kolybelnaya dlya vulkana" and its accompanying music video was presented to the public on 30 April 1995 during the broadcast of national selection on ORT.

At Eurovision

The Eurovision Song Contest 1995 took place at the Point Theatre in Dublin, Ireland, on 13 May 1995. According to the Eurovision rules, the 23-country participant list for the contest was composed of: the winning country from the previous year's contest and host country Ireland, highest placed 17 countries, other than the previous year's winner, from the previous year's contest, five countries which were relegated from the participation in 1994 contest and any eligible countries who didn't participate in 1994 contest. Russia was one of the highest placed 17 countries in 1994 contest, and thus was permitted to participate. The running order for the contest was decided by a draw held on 6 December 1994; Russia was assigned to perform 6th at the 1995 contest, following Norway and preceding Iceland. Eurovision Song Contest 1995 was televised in Russia on ORT in delay without voting sequence on 15 May 1995 and on Radio 101 with the commentary by Olesya Trifonova.

Philipp Kirkorov took part in technical rehearsals on 8 and 10 May, followed by three dress rehearsals held in the afternoon and evening of 12 May and the afternoon of 13 May. The Russian performance featured Kirkorov on stage wearing white shirt and black trousers, joined by internal selection participants Vocal Band as backing vocalists. After the voting concluded, Russia scored 17 points and placed 17th. At the time this result was the Russia's worst placing in its competitive history. Following the contest, ORT implied that Russia had won the contest. The Russian conductor at the contest was Mikhail Finberg.

Voting
The same voting system in use since 1975 was again implemented for 1995 contest, with each country providing 1–8, 10 and 12 points to the ten highest-ranking songs as determined by a jury panel, with countries not allowed to vote for themselves. Russia assembled 16-member jury panel, consisting of Yury Saulsky, Igor Krutoy, Marina Khlebnikova, Lora Kvint, Andrey Bill, Natalia Shemankova, Ninel Yakovenko, Roman Karasev, Konstantin Smertin, Andrey Boltenko, Vladimir Polupanov, Irina Bogushevskaya, Ekaterina Alekseeva and three unnamed representatives of the public, to determine which countries would receive their points. Below is a breakdown of points awarded to Russia and awarded by Russia in the contest. The nation awarded its 12 points to Norway in the contest.

References

Bibliography 
 
 

1995
Countries in the Eurovision Song Contest 1995
Eurovision